The 2016–17 Azadegan League was the 26th season of the Azadegan League and 16th as the second highest division since its establishment in 1991. The season featured 12 teams from the 2015–16 Azadegan League, three new teams relegated from the 2015–16 Persian Gulf Pro League: Malavan, Rah Ahan and Esteghlal Ahvaz and three new teams promoted from the 2015–16 League 2: Oxin Alborz and Sepidrood Rasht both as champions and Pars Jonoubi Jam. Baadraan Tehran replaced Parseh Tehran. The league started on 7 August 2016 and ended on 1 May 2017. Pars Jonoubi Jam won the Azadegan League title for the first time in their history. Pars Jonoubi Jam and Sepidrood Rasht promoted to the Persian Gulf Pro League.

Teams

Stadia and locations

Number of teams by region

League table

Results

Clubs season-progress

Statistics

Top scorers

Notes:Updated to games played on 1 May 2017. Source: lig1.ir

Attendances

Average home attendances

Attendances by round

Notes:Updated to games played on 1 May 2017. Source: lig1.ir  Matches with spectator bans are not included in average attendances  Baadraan Tehran played their matches against Foolad Yazd, Iranjavan, Mes Kerman and  Naft MIS at Ekbatan  Esteghlal Ahvaz played their match against Mes Rafsanjan at Ghadir  Fajr Sepasi played their matches against Aluminium Arak, Baadraan Tehran, Esteghlal Ahvaz, Foolad Yazd, Iranjavan, Khooneh be Khooneh, Oxin Alborz, Pars Jonoubi Jam and Mes Kerman at Shahid Dastgheib

Highest attendances

Notes:Updated to games played on 1 May 2017. Source: lig1.ir

See also
 2016–17 Persian Gulf Pro League
 2016–17 League 2
 2016–17 League 3
 2016–17 Hazfi Cup
 2016 Iranian Super Cup

References

Azadegan League seasons
2016–17 in Asian second tier association football leagues
2016–17 in Iranian football leagues